Services Union is the name of:

 Australian Services Union, a trade union in Australia
 Services Union (Denmark), a Danish trade union
 Services Union (Netherlands), a former Dutch trade union
 United Services Union, an Australian trade union